Paola Bibiana Pérez Saquipay (born 21 December 1989 in Cuenca) is an Ecuadorian race walker. She competed in the 20 km kilometres event at the 2012 and 2016 Summer Olympics.

She represented Ecuador at the 2020 Summer Olympics.

Personal bests

Track walk
10,000 m: 44:51.97 min –  Guayaquil, 18 April 2021
20,000 m: 1:32:26.0 hrs –  Asunción, 24 June 2017

Road walk
20 km walk: 1:29:06 hrs –  Sucúa, 15 April 2017

Achievements

References

External links

Sports reference biography

1989 births
Living people
People from Cuenca, Ecuador
Ecuadorian female racewalkers
Olympic athletes of Ecuador
Athletes (track and field) at the 2012 Summer Olympics
Athletes (track and field) at the 2016 Summer Olympics
Athletes (track and field) at the 2020 Summer Olympics
Pan American Games bronze medalists for Ecuador
Pan American Games medalists in athletics (track and field)
Athletes (track and field) at the 2011 Pan American Games
Athletes (track and field) at the 2015 Pan American Games
Athletes (track and field) at the 2019 Pan American Games
World Athletics Championships athletes for Ecuador
Athletes (track and field) at the 2018 South American Games
South American Games bronze medalists for Ecuador
South American Games medalists in athletics
Competitors at the 2013 Summer Universiade
Medalists at the 2015 Pan American Games
Medalists at the 2019 Pan American Games
21st-century Ecuadorian women